Villanova Stadium is a 12,500 seat stadium located on the campus of Villanova University in Villanova, Pennsylvania, USA.

History
Villanova Stadium was originally built in 1927 and dedicated on October 8, 1927. The stadium plays host to a wide variety of events including serving as home to the Villanova Wildcats football, field hockey, lacrosse, and track and field teams. Philadelphia area teams such as the WUSA's Philadelphia Charge and Major League Lacrosse's Philadelphia Barrage have also used the stadium in the past or currently. In the 1960s, Monsignor Bonner High School, like Villanova an Augustinian school, used the field.

The field and track at Villanova Stadium are known as "Goodreau Field" and "Jumbo Elliott Track," respectively.  On May 7, 1930, the playing field at Villanova Stadium was dedicated to the memory of Leo J. Francis Goodreau, a Villanova football player who died due to injuries incurred in practice.  On September 27, 1980, the running track was dedicated to Villanova's legendary track and field coach James "Jumbo" Elliott.

Renovations
In Fall 1999, the stadium underwent a face-lift with the Stadium Renovation Project. Included in this project was a state of the art press box, in addition to housing an 80-person meeting room for all Villanova Athletic Department personnel to use. The former AstroTurf playing field was replaced during the spring of 2002 with a synthetic grass surface known as AstroPlay.

In Fall 2009, the stadium received a new scoreboard along with a new playing surface.

In 2016, a new football operations building, the Andrew J. Talley Athletic Center, which also serves as the training room for the sports programs at the school, opened, named for the school's first head coach since the May 1984 reinstatement of the program until the end of 2016.

See also
 List of NCAA Division I FCS football stadiums

References

External links

Buildings and structures in Delaware County, Pennsylvania
College football venues
College lacrosse venues in the United States
Former Major League Lacrosse venues
Athletics (track and field) venues in Pennsylvania
College track and field venues in the United States 
Soccer venues in Pennsylvania
Villanova Wildcats football
Lacrosse venues in the United States
Sports venues completed in 1927
College field hockey venues in the United States
1927 establishments in Pennsylvania